Bharat Petroleum Corporation Limited (BPCL) is an Indian central public sector undertaking under the ownership of Ministry of Petroleum and Natural Gas, Government of India. It operates three refineries in Bina, Kochi and Mumbai. BPCL is India's second-largest government-owned downstream oil producer, whose operations are overseen by the Ministry of Petroleum and Natural Gas. It was ranked 309th on the 2020 Fortune list of the world's biggest public sector undertakings, and 792nd on Forbes's 2021 "Global 2000" list.

History

1891 to 1976
The company today known as BPCL started off as Rangoon Oil and Exploration company set up to explore the new discoveries off Assam and Burma (now Myanmar) during the British colonial rule over India. In 1889 during vast industrial development, an important player in the South Asian market was the Burmah Oil Company. Though incorporated in Scotland in 1886, the company grew out of the enterprises of the Chef Rohit Oil Company, which had been formed in 1871 to refine crude oil produced from primitive hand dug wells in Upper Burma.

In 1928, Asiatic Petroleum Company (India) started cooperation with Burma Oil Company. Asiatic Petroleum was a joint venture of Royal Dutch, Shell and Rothschilds formed to address the monopoly of John D. Rockefeller's Standard Oil, which also operated in India as Esso. This alliance led to the formation of Burmah-Shell Oil Storage and Distributing Company of India Limited. Burmah Shell began its operations with import and marketing of Kerosene.

In the mid-1950s, the company began to sell LPG cylinders to homes in India and further expanded its delivery network. It also marketed kerosene, diesel and petrol in cans in order to reach remote parts of India. In 1951, the Burmah shell began to build a refinery in Trombay (Mahul, Maharashtra) under an agreement with the Government of India.

Nationalisation

In 1976, the company was nationalized under the Act on the Nationalisation of Foreign Oil companies ESSO (1974), Burma Shell (1976) and Caltex (1977). On 24 January 1976, the Burmah Shell was taken over by the Government of India to form Bharat Refineries Limited. On 1 August 1977, it was renamed Bharat Petroleum Corporation Limited. It was also the first refinery to process newly found indigenous crude Bombay High.

In 2003, the government attempted to privatize the company. However, following a petition by the Centre for Public Interest Litigation, the Supreme Court restrained the Central government from privatizing Hindustan Petroleum and Bharat Petroleum without the approval of Parliament.
As counsel for the CPIL, Rajinder Sachar and Prashant Bhushan said that the only way to disinvest in the companies would be to repeal or amend the Acts by which they were nationalized in the 1970s.
As a result, the government would need a majority in both houses to push through any privatization.

Parliament enacted the Repealing and Amending Act, 2016 in May 2016 which repealed the legislation that had nationalized the company. In 2017, Bharat Petroleum Corporation Limited (BPCL) received Maharatna status, putting it in the category of government-owned entities in India with the largest market capitalization and consistently high profits. In 2021, BPCL announced plans to invest  billion in order to improve petrochemical capacity and refining efficiencies, over the next five years.

Operations 
Bharat Petroleum operates the following refineries:
 
 Mumbai Refinery : Located near Mumbai, Maharashtra. It has a capacity of 13 million metric tonnes per annum. 
 Kochi Refinery : Located near Kochi, Kerala. It has a capacity of 15.5  million metric tonnes per annum.
 Bina Refinery : Located near Bina, Sagar district, Madhya Pradesh. It has a capacity of 7.8  million metric tonnes per year. This refinery started as Bharat Oman Refineries Limited (BORL), a joint venture between Bharat Petroleum and OQ (formerly known as Oman Oil Company). As of April 2021, BORL is a subsidiary of BPCL.

They have popular Loyalty Program like Petrocard, Smartfleet.

, BPCL was also setting up a Second-generation biofuels refinery at Baulsingha village in Bargarh district, Odisha of 100 kilo litre per day (KLPD) capacity. The plant would be using 2 Lakh tonnes of rice straw to generate fuel.

Subsidiaries 
Indraprastha Gas Limited (IGL), a joint venture between Gas Authority of India Limited (GAIL), Bharat Petroleum Corporation Limited (BPCL) and the Government of Delhi to operate the Delhi City Gas Distribution Project.

Petronet LNG, a joint venture company promoted by the Gas Authority of India Limited (GAIL), Oil and Natural Gas Corporation Limited (ONGC), Indian Oil Corporation Limited (IOC) and Bharat Petroleum Corporation Limited (BPCL) to import LNG and set up LNG terminals in the country.

Bharat Renewable Energy Limited, a joint venture company promoted by BPCL with Nandan Cleantech Limited (Nandan Biomatrix Limited), Hyderabad and Shapoorji Pallonji Group, through their affiliate, S.P. Agri Management Services Pvt.Ltd. specializes in offering Bio diesel plants, ethanol, bio-diesel plants, Karanj (Millettia pinnata), Jatropha and Pongamia (Pongamia Pinnata) plantation services, renewable generation services etc. In 2013 Shapoorji Pallonji Group exited the joint venture.

Ownership
Recently cabinet has cleared the plan to sell 53.3% of its stake in bharat petroleum corporation (BPCL) with the rest owned by Foreign PortInstitute estors (13.7%), Domestic Institute Investors (12%), Insurance companies (8.24%) and the balance held by individual share holders.

Disinvestment 
On 21 November 2019, the Government of India approved the privatization of Bharat Petroleum Corporation Limited (BPCL). The government invited bids for the sale of its 52.98% stake in the company on 7 March 2020. The Government decided to consolidate the businesses of BPCL before privatization starting with the Numaligarh Refinery Ltd. (NRL). The Government decided to keep Numaligarh Refinery Ltd. (NRL) in the public sector, honouring the Assam Peace Accord. On Mar 2021, Bharat Petroleum Corporation Ltd (BPCL) sold its entire 61.5% stake in Numaligarh Refinery in Assam to a consortium of Oil India Ltd. and Engineers India Ltd. and Government of Assam for ₹9,876 crore. BPCL also acquired a 36.62% stake in Bharat Oman Refineries (BORL) or Bina refinery situated at Bina in Madhya Pradesh, India from OQ (formerly known as Oman Oil Company), for ₹2,400 crore. BPCL has been holding 63.4 per cent and OQ 36.6 per cent equity in the company. The Government of Madhya Pradesh has a minor stake in the company through compulsorily convertible warrants. With the acquisition of OQ's entire stake in BORL, BPCL will establish control over BORL.

The Indian Government attempted to sell BPCL during fiscal year 2021–2022. However, the sale of BPCL has been pushed to fiscal year 2022–2023, and it has been reported that the Government is building a new strategy for the sale of the company. In addition to this, it has also been reported that rising oil prices, along with increasing development and use of green energy, is leading to delays in the privatisation process.

See also

 List of companies of India
 List of largest companies by revenue
 List of public corporations by market capitalization
 Make in India
 Forbes Global 2000
 Fortune India 500
 Rajiv Gandhi Institute of Petroleum Technology

References

External links 
 
 Business data for Bharat Petroleum: Reuters, Google Finance, BloombergQuint

Oil and gas companies of India
Oil pipeline companies
Government-owned companies of India
Companies based in Mumbai
Energy companies established in 1976
Non-renewable resource companies established in 1976
Indian companies established in 1976
Companies nationalised by the Government of India
NIFTY 50
Indian brands
India
1976 establishments in Maharashtra
Companies listed on the National Stock Exchange of India
Companies listed on the Bombay Stock Exchange